Marnie Mueller (born Tule Lake War Relocation Center) is an American novelist.

Life
In 1963 she joined the Peace Corps, serving two years in Guayaquil, Ecuador.
She worked for WBAI as Programming Director, but resigned in 1977, over staff cuts. 
She lives in New York City, with her husband Fritz Mueller.

Awards
 Maria Thomas Award for Outstanding Fiction, for Green Fires
 1995 American Book Award, for Green Fires

Works

Anthologies

Criticism
"Review: Selected Accidents, Pointless Anecdotes", Peace Corps Writers

References

External links
"Author's website"
"An interview with Marnie Mueller About MY MOTHER'S ISLAND", Curbstone, Jane Blanshard

20th-century American novelists
21st-century American novelists
American women novelists
Writers from New York City
Living people
Peace Corps volunteers
20th-century American women writers
21st-century American women writers
American Book Award winners
Novelists from New York (state)
Year of birth missing (living people)